Muhammad Loutfi Goumah  ( muħammæd lūtfi ǧomʿa; also spelled Mohammed Lotfy Gomaa or Muhammed Lotfy Jouma' ) (January 18, 1886 Alexandria − June 15, 1953 Cairo), is an Egyptian patriot, essayist, author, and barrister, he studied law and became one of Egypt's most famous lawyers and public speakers. He was a member of the prestigious Arab Academy of Damascus, he spoke Arabic, English, French and Italian, he also had a profound knowledge of Hieroglyphic and Latin.

Early life and education

Goumah was born in Alexandria, the second biggest city in Egypt, then under the British occupation. His father was the honorable sayed Goumah Aboul-Kheir, a descendant of prophet Muhammad, his mother Khadeeja Mahmoud Al-Sonbaty, an Egyptian lady of Egyptian, Turkish and French ancestors. His mother couldn't breast-feed, and he was breastfed by Molouk Eid, the Mother of the famous Arab music composer Sayed Darwish. His family moved to the city of Tanta, where he joined the Coptic school, his family then moved him to the Prince's School, where he finished his primary education in 1900, he joined the khedive's school, where he finished his secondary education in 1903, his mother died in 1903 and Goumah traveled to Beirut and joined the American College in Beirut to study philosophy. He returned to Egypt and worked as a school teacher at the Helwan primary school, until late 1907, when he acquired his baccalaureate. He joined the Khedive's Law School in 1908 to earn a degree in law but was expelled after a speech he made in the 40th day death anniversary of Mostafa Kamel. He left to France and joined the law school of Lyon University and studied law under the famous French scholar Eduoard Lambert and after acquiring his PhD in late 1912, Goumah returned to Egypt and started his career as a lawyer.

Teaching
Loutfi Goumah taught through two periods of his life, the first period was at the Helwan primary school( late 1904 to late 1907), among his students were Abdulrahman Azzam and Abdulrahman Al-Sawy, The Faculty of Engineering first dean, the second period was in 1917 when he taught Criminal Law at the Cairo University.

Influence

Goumah Started writing articles against the British occupation in Egypt through "al-Zaher" newspaper since early 1905, yet a speech he made during the celebration of the coronation of the khedive Abbas II of Egypt, in which he explained the Détente policy between England and France and blamed the Khedive for supporting the British occupation's interests annoyed the khedive and he was soon expelled from "al-Zaher". He went off to join Mustafa Kamil as an editor for the Egyptian Standard along with Charles Rudy and William Maloney.

Since then, Goumah wrote in tens of periodicals and newspapers accumulating thousands of articles. He wrote extensively in al-Ahram, al-Balagh, al-Zaher, al-Balagh weekly, al-Bayan, al-Moqtabas. His articles covered many aspects of the Egyptian life during that era, ranging from economics, international politics, political philosophy to literature, literary criticism and sufism.

Goumah raised in his articles subjects that were addressed in Egypt and other Arab Countries decades after his death. He called for Free education at Al-Balagh in May, 1930, nearly two decades before Taha Hussein, then the Egyptian minister of education started implementing it. In 1933, he criticized in his novel Aida (published in Al-balagh), the Egyptian personal status laws for giving only men the right for divorce, the same law Goumah refused to adopt when getting married by offering his wife equal rights regarding divorce. It was only in 2001 when the Egyptian personal status law accommodated (khol'e Arabic  خلع) a method by which women may divorce in compliance with Islamic sharia. He wrote in "al-Rabetah al-Arabeyya" in 1938 criticizing  polygamy and called for strict regulations to control it.

Goumah's interpretation of Islamic scripture didn't contradict - in his opinion - with his views regarding his firm support to the feminist ideologies, nor did it contradict with his dedicated interest in metaphysics, sufism and spiritualism, subjects that are still looked upon with scepticism among "orthodox" Muslim scholars. According to Anwar al-Gendy the Islamic thinker and author, Goumah represents the soul of the moderate school with a clear affiliation and belief in the orient, Islam and Egypt.

Political Activity

Nationalism

In 1906 and during a vacation in Lausanne, Switzerland, Goumah was introduced to Mustafa Kamil and Mohammad Farid the founders of the Egyptian National Party and famous Egyptian patriots. Kamil and Farid were touring Europe head hunting for editors for the "Egyptian Standard", their new newspaper. Goumah was intrigued by the charisma of Mustafa Kamil and joined the Egyptian National party having believed in Mustafa kamil's cause.

Congress of the Jeunesse Egyptienne, Geneva, 1909
During his university years in France, Goumah continued his political activities by forming student groups, writing speeches and corresponding with different political figures in Europe, who were known for their support and sympathy for the Egyptian cause against the British occupation. He participated in three conferences held in Geneva, Brussels and Paris in 1909, 1910, 1911 respectively.

Wilfrid Scawen Blunt

One of the figures Goumah corresponded with during his residence in Europe was the English Poet Wilfrid Scawen Blunt, who was known for his support to the Egyptian cause and for his support to Ahmed Orabi the Egyptian Nationalist who revolted against the Khedive Tewfik. Blunt was also a friend of famous Egyptian Grand Mufti Muhammad Abduh of which Goumah was a disciple. Abduh used to say that Blunt is "just a noble Englishman who is loyal to Egypt, the Arabs, Islam and Humanity".
Goumah travelled to Britain to consult with Blunt on political issues in August 1909 and spent the night at his estate "Newbuildings". He also received a copy of a speech to be read on Blunt's behalf for the Congress in Geneva. Goumah kept the relationship with Blunt until Blunt's death in 1922. The West Sussex Record Office has records for 203 letters between Goumah and Blunt.

Addressing Keir Hardie

Thomas Kettle

Thomas Kettle the Irish journalist, barrister and MP in the House of Commons of the United Kingdom of Great Britain and Ireland, Recorded in his book The Day's Burden, Studies, Literary and Political -1910, P.112 this incident:

The Egyptian National Conference, Brussels, 1910

In 1910, Aristide Briand, then the Prime Minister and Minister of Interior of France, summoned Goumah, Mohammad Farid and Hamed El-Alayli (an Egyptian Nationalist studying at Oxford) to his office and informed them that the French Authorities were reluctant to host the Egyptian National Conference on French soil; he suggested Switzerland or Luxembourg as valid alternatives. Both Goumah and Farid expressed their disappointment; they also complained about being followed by British secret service agents in France, a complaint that was denied by Briand, claiming that "they imagine seeing the Brits everywhere".

The Egyptian National Conference was held in Brussels on 22 September 1910 and a book was issued recording its event:
"Œuvres du congrès national égyptien tenu a Bruxelles le 22, 23 et 24 septembre , Bruges, 1911".

Indians in Exile

During his years in France, Goumah got in contact with many Indian patriots in exile, some were members of the India House, others were from the Paris Indian Society. Among them were Vinayak Damodar Savarkar, Virendranath Chattopadhyaya, Har Dayal, Shyamji Krishnavarma and Bhikaiji Cama, who were known for sympathizing with the Egyptian cause. Goumah tried to resolve the conflict between Madam Cama and Krishnavarma

Meeting Gandhi

On 7 September 1931 Goumah boarded the SS Rajputana in Port Said to meet with Mahatma Gandhi, the meeting lasted for eight hours.

Legal career

The Amin Ossman Case

In 1912, having returned from France, Goumah passed the Bar Examination that was focused entirely on his knowledge of Islamic Shari'a and Islamic Inheritance jurisprudence  and in 1915 he was appointed as a lawyer in front of the Egyptian appeals court.
Goumah has been appointed as the defence lawyer for some of the most famous cases known to the Egyptian society at the time, including: the Lee Stack murder case, the bombs case and the Amin Ossman murder case, in which he represented Ahmed Wassim Khaled and Muhammed Anwar al-Sadat.

Goumah mentioned in his memoirs the trial of Anwar al-Sadat - then an army officer - and others, in the murder case of Egypt's minister of finance Amin Ossman, the defendants which Goumah referred to as the "boys" refused to get into a cage that was designed not to allow any physical contact with them:

Islamic Philosophy and Sufism

During his high school years at the khedive's school, Goumah studied Arabic literature, metaphysics and Philosophy under sheikh Tantawy Gohary the famous Islamic scholar and Egypt's Nobel prize nominee, and the author of "The Jewels in Interpreting the Holy Quraan", Gohary introduced him to Islamic Philosophy and Spiritualism . he then corresponded with sheikh Muhammed Abduh the Grand Mufti of Egypt and eventually became one of his disciples. Two of Goumah's letters to the grand mufti at the age of 18, were published in Rashid Rida's book on Muhammad Adbuh, with Rashid commenting on one of them:

Both Gohary and Abduh were icons of enlightenment, and they both became pillars of Goumah's intellectual structure. He wrote many articles and books discussing, debating, defining and recording the lives of famous Islamic philosophers and Sufis'. His book "History of Islamic Philosophers in the East and West" is considered one of the finest references written on the subject to date.

al-Shehab Arr'aassed

In June 1926, A group of Al-Azhar scholars visited Goumah in his office asking him to sue Taha Hussein for writing his controversial book Pre-Islamic poetry, Goumah - who has not read the book - ordered a copy, and after reading what Taha Hussein has written and the philosophical argument he adopted in his book, Goumah refused to sue Hussein, but rather decided to write a book that defies Hussien's philosophical approach. The book whose name was derived for a quranic verse in surat Al-Jinn that may literally mean "The monitoring Comet Arabic الشهاب الراصد Pronounced Alshehab Arr'aassed" became Goumah's most famous work.

In "Pre-Islamic poetry" Hussien claimed using Descartes Methodic doubt process to analyse pre-Islamic scripture: Poetry and prose, he concluded that most if not All what was claimed to be pre-Islamic is in fact written after Islam for political and tribal reasons.

Goumah based his argument on a technical philosophical approach, he debated the flows in the derivations concluded by Hussein on pure academic grounds by re-explaining the methods of Descartes, he then supported his argument with historical, linguistic and social facts. The tides against Hussein's book grew higher and higher and eventually Hussein removed the four sections of his book that were taken against him and renamed the book "Pre-Islamic Literature".

Louis Massignon and al-Hallaj
Having written a few articles in al-Rabetah al-Arabeyyah magazine in 1937 about al-Hallaj, Goumah was called on by Louis Massignon the famous French orientalist at Goumah house in Heliopolis to discuss Al-Hallaj, their meetings and correspondences continued until Goumah's death in 1953. Massignon was particularly interested in a book Goumah was writing about al-Hallaj, yet died without finishing it.

Death
Goumah Died suffering from the complications of a cerebral infarction on 15 June 1953.

His Memoires
Goumah started recording his diaries in 1909, it suffered periods of discontinuity that may sometimes reach several months after which, he would resume writing. He has written a long introduction that covers the period from his birth to the date he started writing the memoires):

Augusta Filippovna Damansky

Goumah's memoirs were printed in 2000 in two books, the first was published under the title: "Muhammad Loutfi Goumah - Witness to an Era" (Part I - II), the second -released in 1999- reveals Goumah's love story with Russian author and essayist Augusta Damansky, under the title "Memoirs of Youth  - the anniversary of March 19," in which complete sections of his diaries; in addition to a set of letters sent by Augusta to Loutfi Goumah were included. In his memoires, Goumah reveals the story of an emotional Platonic relationship that lasted for nearly four years with Augusta, they toured throughout Europe together and he recorded the evolution of their relationship in a chapter in his diaries called the "March 19 anniversary" (the date of their first meeting). He Dedicated his translation of The Prince by Machiavelli to her, he wrote a play called "The woman's heart" about her, and used a pseudonym (Auguste Filippov), clearly derived from her name to write some articles in the weekly magazine "The Arab Association" in 1930, and in 1939 he published some of her letters addressed to him claiming they were addressed to a poet named (Popov Ludowski), a name Augusta addressed him with in her letters.

Controversy about the Memoires
When published, the memoires raised controversy among critics, some of whom praised it for the amount of detail it included about the political, literary and cultural aspects of life in Egypt (1909–1948), others directed a scathing criticism to the views Goumah displayed therein, they criticised its subjective style and its obvious pessimism and bitterness with which Goumah referred to some literary and political figures of his time. It was also criticized for being subjected to heavy editing, prohibiting certain periods from publication (1918–1921), and its poor arrangement (adding articles and studies outside the context of the memoirs).

Also, the memoires were criticised for extracting parts of it to be published in separate books like Goumah's relationship with Augusta (Memoirs of Youth - the anniversary of March 19) or Goumah's relationship with the French orientalist Louis Massignon, which is published in a book titled: (Tunisia in the writings of Loutfi Goumah - by Rabeh Loutfi Goumah).

His unpublished work
A number of scholars went through the manuscripts of Goumah's unpublished work, led by his son Rabeh, who filed, arranged, collected and printed many of them. Goumah's unpublished manuscripts were mostly in the form of notebooks or papers. Dr. Ahmad Hussein al-Tamawy, Egyptian author and writer along with Dr. Sayed Ali Ismael of al-Minya University and Dr. Ibrahim Awad of Ain Shams University, revised many of Goumah's manuscripts, adding footnotes, identifying the different historical characters mentioned in Goumah's works. They also made literary critique for some of his plays.

His most famous literary works

Studies
Renaissance in Italy - 1911
History of Social Science - 1919
Plato's Banquet - 1920
The Monitoring Comet - 1926
History of Islamic Philosophers in the East and West - 1927
Life of the Orient: its countries, people, past and present - 1932
Revolution of Islam and the Hero of Prophets - 1939
Blessed days in Holy Lands - 1940
Memoirs of Youth - the anniversary of March 19
Modern Revision of the Holy Quraan

Novels and Short Stories

In the Homes of People - 1904
In the Valley of Concerns - 1904
The Nights of the Confused Soul - 1912
The Fair Young Man - 1930
The Embryo - 1930
For the sake of life and Death - 1931
Aieda - 1932
After Repention - 1932
Qorrat Al-Ain - 1934
Corlinko and Evagina - 1937
Mukhtarah - 1941

Plays
Niro - 1919
The Stolen Heritage - 1932
The Death of Al-Hallaj- 1942

Translations
The Liberation of Egypt - 1906
The Immortal Magician - 1906
The Oriental Wisdom - 1912
The Prince - 1912
Ulysses - 1947

References

External links
Œuvres du congrès national égyptien tenu a Bruxelles le 22, 23 et 24 septembre, Bruges, 1911
Thomas Kettle: The Day's Burden, Studies, Literary and Political -1910 
Wilfred Scawen Blunt: My Diaries; Being A Personal Narrative Of Events, 1888-1914 Volume II 
The Memoirs of Muhammad Loutfi Goumh, Part 1. 

1886 births
1953 deaths
Muslim reformers
Egyptian writers
Arabic-language novelists
Egyptian Sunni Muslim scholars of Islam
University of Lyon alumni
Academic staff of Cairo University